The acronym C2K may refer to:
 Classroom 2000 - a Northern Ireland-wide information and communications network
 Coast To Kosciuszko - ultramarathon run from sea level in mainland Australia